Deep Space/Virgin Sky is a 1995 album by Jefferson Starship recorded live at the House of Blues in West Hollywood on the Sunset Strip.  The concert was performed as a benefit memorial for violinist Papa John Creach, who had died in 1994, with proceeds going to his family.  

The original album rearranged the order of songs as performed and was divided into two parts with the first half featuring new material and the second half of the album featuring the classic hits of Jefferson Starship and Jefferson Airplane, including an appearance by Grace Slick performing vocals on "Law Man", "Wooden Ships", "Somebody to Love" and "White Rabbit".  It was the first time she had performed on stage since 1989.  In 2003, the entire concert was released as a double CD entitled "Deeper Space / Extra Virgin Sky" with the original order of the performance restored.

Original Track Listing (1995)

Expanded Track Listing (2003)

Personnel
Jack Casady – basses
Marty Balin – lead vocals, acoustic guitar, percussion
Paul Kantner – lead vocals, 12-string guitar
Prairie Prince – drums
Slick Aguilar – lead guitar
Tim Gorman – keyboards, vocals
Darby Gould – vocals

Additional Personnel
Grace Slick – vocals on "Somebody to Love", "Law Man", "Wooden Ships", "White Rabbit" and "Volunteers"
Merl Saunders – keyboards on "John's Other"
David LaFlamme – violin on "John's Other"

Production
Michael Gaiman – producer
Paul Kantner – producer
Greg Irons – cover art (original release)
Priaire Prince – inside art (original release), cover art (expanded release)
Andy Slote – mixing
Jeff Kilment – remixing
Rebecca Inez Bockelie – poetry
Otto Rene Castillo – poetry

References

Jefferson Starship albums
1995 live albums